Makwa Lake 129 is an Indian reserve of the Makwa Sahgaiehcan First Nation in Saskatchewan. It is 151 kilometres northwest of North Battleford. In the 2016 Canadian Census, it recorded a population of 15 living in 5 of its 5 total private dwellings.

References

Indian reserves in Saskatchewan
Division No. 17, Saskatchewan